The Voice of the Martyrs (VOM) is an international nonprofit organization whose mission is to defend the human rights of persecuted Christians.

History
The organization was founded in 1967 by Richard Wurmbrand, a Lutheran priest, also a Pentecostal, and Romanian of Jewish descent who spent fourteen years in a Communist prison for his faith in Christ in the Socialist Republic of Romania, which held a policy of state atheism. The US organization today is a $50 million ministry providing practical and spiritual assistance to persecuted Christians in 68 countries. In 2016, VOM-USA completed more than 1,500 ministry projects, providing help to more than 5 million people.

There are a number of Voice of the Martyrs organizations around the world. Each mission is autonomous (and not all use the "Voice of the Martyrs" name), but they cooperate through the International Christian Association (ICA). While each country's mission has its own focus and management, they also cooperate through the ICA by sharing information and jointly funding international projects. Each office is funded through donations. There is no world headquarters or main office for Voice of the Martyrs, as each organization is an independent, self-supporting entity.[4]

Early history
The Voice of the Martyrs was founded in 1967 under the name "Jesus to the Communist World" by Richard Wurmbrand, a Romanian Lutheran priest of Jewish descent, who had worked with the underground church in Romania after it was taken over in 1944 by the USSR, which held a policy of state atheism and implemented antireligious legislation. As a consequence, he was imprisoned for 14 years for preaching Christianity. His wife, Sabina, was imprisoned for three years, including being held in a labor camp and forced to work on building the Donaukanal. The Wurmbrand family was eventually freed to the West after a ransom was paid for Richard's release.

In 1966, Wurmbrand  testified before the Internal Security Subcommittee of the U.S. Senate about the treatment that Christians received under communist governments, raising worldwide interest in Christian persecution, and through his influence several missions were founded around the world to help support Christians who suffered under Communist persecution. After the fall of communism in the Soviet Union and Eastern Europe, these missions expanded their focus to include those suffering religious persecution in Islamic, Hindu, and Buddhist societies.

Financial accountability 
The US office of The Voice of the Martyrs is organized as a 501(c)(3) nonprofit corporation and reports 95% of revenue is derived from public support. In 2016, 81.8% of donated funds were used towards ministry purposes, which break into the following categories: Persecution Response, Bibles to Captive Nations, Front-Line Ministry, and Fellowship & Inspiration. Of VOM-USA's income, 12 percent was spent on administration and 6.2 percent on fundraising. The ministry is now registered as a Religious Order and as such it no longer annually files form 990 with the IRS. VOM-USA is accredited by the Evangelical Council for Financial Accountability (ECFA), and financial information about VOM can be found on ECFA's web site. Audited financial statements for the past three years are also available at VOM-USA's web site.

Publications
Each individual mission office publishes a regular newsletter for distribution in their own country. Each issue focuses on stories of the persecution of Christians, and offers testimonies as well as outlets for readers to get involved with persecuted Christians. The subscription to the 12-16 page newsletter is free.

Each mission also has other efforts to communicate the testimonies of persecuted Christians and stories of God's faithfulness to them. VOM-USA produces a weekly radio program, which is currently heard on more than 700 radio stations across the United States and has reached the top spot on iTunes "Religion and Spirituality" podcast chart. Missions also produce video content, including videos to promote The International Day of Prayer for the Persecuted Church, which is honored on the first Sunday in November.

Controversy
In 2012, the executive director of VOM-USA, Tom White, committed suicide after allegations of child abuse were made against him. Within two weeks of his death, VOM-USA mailed a letter to every name on the ministry mailing list to inform readers of his suicide and the allegations that had been made.

In 2014, Michael Wurmbrand, the son of founder Richard Wurmbrand, was fired from his position at VOM-USA's office after calling for an independent investigation into the overseas activities of Tom White.  He was concerned that more children might have been molested.  Michael released a statement concerning the firing which criticized the unwillingness of the board to do an investigation, the $28 million new headquarters, concerns about the criminal record background of one of the VOM-US vice presidents, and other related concerns.

In 2017, allegations were made public by dismissed employees against the leader of Voice of the Christian Martyrs - Nigeria. The allegations have been supported by former students at the school run by VOCM, including alleged victims. As of May 2018, Nigerian authorities have charged and released on bail the director, Isaac Oluwole Newton-Wusu, a defamation case has been filed against the accusers in Nigerian court, a defamation case has been filed against the director by the accusers, and a civil suit has been filed by several of the alleged victims for threats made by the director. Prior to these allegations becoming public, VOM-USA had cut off funding to VOCM-Nigeria after the mission refused to address overcrowding in a children's home operated by VOCM.

In 2020, Eric Foley, with Voice of the Martyrs Korea, was accused of violating the inter-Korean exchange law for launching Bible balloons from South Korea into North Korea.

Other VOM Missions
 Australia
 Belgium
 Brazil
 Canada
 Chile
 / Czech Republic
 Finland
 Germany
 Italy
 The Netherlands
 New Zealand
 Poland
 Portugal
 South Africa
 South Korea
 United Kingdom
 United States

See also 

 International Christian Concern, a Christian human rights NGO
 Open Doors
 Christian Solidarity Worldwide
 International Christian Association

References

Persecution of Christians
International human rights organizations
Christian advocacy groups
Human rights organizations based in the United States
Organizations established in 1967
501(c)(3) organizations
Anti-communist organizations